Dener Jaanimaa (born 9 August 1989) is an Estonian handball player who plays for HBC CSKA Moscow and the Estonian national team.

References

1989 births
Living people
Sportspeople from Tallinn
Estonian male handball players
Handball-Bundesliga players
THW Kiel players
MT Melsungen players
TuS Nettelstedt-Lübbecke players
HC Motor Zaporizhia players
Expatriate handball players
Estonian expatriate sportspeople in Sweden
Estonian expatriate sportspeople in Germany
Estonian expatriate sportspeople in Ukraine
Estonian expatriate sportspeople in Russia
Estonian expatriate sportspeople in Japan